The chapters of the Japanese manga series RG Veda were written and illustrated by Clamp and serialized in Shinshokan's monthly manga magazine Wings. The story of the manga features elements of Vedic mythology; the title itself imitates Rigveda, the name of one of the four Vedas.

The individual chapters were later collected into ten tankōbon volumes by Shinshokan and published between 1990 and 1996. The series has been licensed for an English-language release in North America and the United Kingdom by Tokyopop.



Volume list

References

RG Veda